Gigolos is an American reality television series about the lives of five male escorts in Las Vegas. The series follows the men, all employees of the same escort agency, through their daily lives and interactions with each other. Cameras also follow the escorts on their appointments with women, including their sexual activity. The series debuted on the premium cable channel Showtime in 2011, and the final episode aired in 2016.

Gigolos was met with critical confusion regarding the legality of the activities it portrays and amazement that women would consent to being filmed purchasing sexual services. Critics were largely  negative in the beginning, although a few had offered the series guarded praise.

Cast

Main
 Nick Hawk (Season 1–end): Mixed Martial Arts fighter and entrepreneur.
 Brace Land (Season 1–end): The eldest escort and developing a product line that may allow him to retire from the business.
 Vin Armani (Season 1–end): Guy with Big Dongle
 Ash Ahmand (Season 3–end): Described in publicity material as a "raven-haired hunk".
 Bradley Lords (Season 4–end): A former Marine and self-professed "cougar magnet".
 Garren James (Recurring: Seasons 1–end): Owner of the Cowboys4Angels escort service.

Former
 Jimmy Clabots (as Jimmy Dior) (Season 1–2): An actor (Another Gay Sequel: Gays Gone Wild!) and personal trainer.
 Steven Gantt (Season 1–3): A single father who escorts to support his son.

After season one was taped, sources reported that Steven and Jimmy had left Cowboys4Angels. Both men remained in the cast for season two.

Production and development
Speaking at the January 2011 Television Critics Association press tour, Showtime entertainment president David Nevins told critics that the sexually explicit Gigolos was part of an overall vision for the network. "We are a pay cable service and I think it's about doing things with some depth and sophistication and taking people places they couldn't go on other networks."

Showtime ordered a second season of eight episodes and it debuted October 20, 2011. Showtime renewed the series for a third season to begin filming June 2012, but announced it would be without Jimmy Clabots. Season three premiered August 30, 2012. Season four began filming in Las Vegas January 16, 2013 and premiered April 18th, 2013. Season 5 premiered on January 23, 2014.

Showtime has renewed Gigolos for a sixth season. On March 21, 2015, it was announced that the sixth season would begin shooting that April. And that they are looking for some couples and women to cast in the show. The final episode of Gigolos aired in 2016.

Legality
Outside of legalized brothels located away from metropolitan areas, prostitution is illegal in Nevada, carrying a penalty of a $1,000 fine and up to six months in jail. In the premiere episode, James explains the "legal fig leaf" under which the service operates to new hire Vin: "We are a companion service and clients pay a rate per hour.  First thing you're gonna do is collect the money from the client and then from there, whatever happens between you two is two consenting adults. It's illegal for you to take any money after that for any sort of sexual services or whatever." The closing credits include disclaimers: everyone shown having sex on-camera is of legal age; and "No one depicted in this program was remunerated in exchange for engaging in sexual activity."

Las Vegas Police spokesperson Marcus Martin disputed the legality of the sexual activity in an interview with the Las Vegas Review-Journal. "They can play the line as loose as they want to, semantically, but they're still violating the law." Since the recorded conduct did not occur in front of an officer it does not constitute an arrestable offense, although there could be "repercussions" in the future, according to Martin.

Legitimacy
Questions have been raised about the legitimacy of the series and whether the men on it are really working prostitutes. The Daily Beast located one woman who appeared on the series who stated that the show is entirely fictional and that the sex is simulated. "They found me through a website. They wanted to know what skills I had. Then they created a scenario where I would need an escort, and they hired me." She looks upon her appearance as an acting job. She does, however, believe that the men are really prostitutes. Vin Armani stated that the men really do work as gigolos but believes that none of them actually live in Las Vegas.

According to James, the women who appeared in the series did not pay for their time with the escorts and in fact were compensated for their appearances. Some of the women were previous clients of his service, while he recruited others. He refused to say exactly how much the women were paid other than saying it was a "small sum". Some have also observed that certain women portrayed in the series were actually pornographic actresses playing the role of a housewife, singer or model. James stated that while the men really are gigolos, they do not escort full-time. "Most of my men have other jobs. They see clients at night and on weekends. Most go to castings as models and actors or have personal training gigs. Women tend to book longer appointments so only seeing two clients per week for four hours at a time is $2,000 per week. Lots of guys get booked at least once a month for a weekend at $5,000 as the fee. Yes, most of the men can make a very good living off just doing this alone but they have so much free time to pursue other things so they usually do."

Episodes

Season 1 (2011)

Season 2 (2011)

Season 3 (2012)

Season 4 (2013)

Season 5 (2014)

Season 5 premiered on January 23, 2014.

Season 6 (2016)

Season 6 premiered on March 17, 2016.

Critical response
In a somewhat more positive review for Variety, Brian Lowry thought that "the series proves reasonably compelling while relying on typical tricks of the trade". Expressing the same amazement that people signed releases to appear on the series, Lowry concludes that even a cynical viewer can find something about Gigolos to admire, even if begrudgingly.

Salon's Tracy Clark-Flory wondered whether the usual blurring between fiction and reality on reality television had been blurred by Gigolos to the point of pornography. Despite acknowledging how the worlds of pornography and reality television have already blended, she still found that Gigolos' "genre confusion creates a jarring dissonance" and that its combination of explicit sex scenes with the staples of reality television (e.g. confessional interview segments) "makes for a confusing mix of contradictory cultural expectations".

Claire Zulkey of The A.V. Club graded the first episode a B. She found that the sex scenes have "a certain clinical feel" and that the non-sexual scenes are "odd and stiff", with the scenes in which viewers learn more about the escorts being the least interesting. Gigolos, she concludes, is the show to watch for those who want to see sex but don't want to watch an actual pornographic film.

See also
 Male prostitution in the arts

References

External links
: Cowboys4Angels

Gigolos renewed for a sixth season

2010s American reality television series
2011 American television series debuts
Showtime (TV network) original programming
English-language television shows
Male prostitution in the arts
Television shows set in the Las Vegas Valley
Reality Entertainment films
Prostitution in American television